GM (Russian: Gusenichnaya Mashina, Гусеничная машина, lit. tracked machine) is a series of tracked vehicle chassis. Generally, the series is produced by Mytishchi Machine-Building Plant. Some older series were developed and produced by Minsk Tractor Works (MTZ)

GM-569

GM-569 is used for the TELAR 9A38, part of the Buk-M1-2 SAM system.

Specifications 
 Chassis weight: 24,000 kg
 Max load: 11,500 kg
 Wheelbase: 4,605 mm
 Ground clearance: 450 mm
 Fuel distance: 500 km
 Working environment
 outside temperature: −50°C — +50°C
 relative air humidity: 98% (t = +35 °C)
 overall dust level while driving < 2,5 g/m3
 Max velocity: 65 km/h
 Average ground unit pressure < 0,8 kg/cm2
 Engine type: Multifuel liquid-cooled diesel
 On-board powerplant: 522 kW (710 h.p.) — 618 kW (840 h.p.)

Other types of chassis 
Designed and developed at Metrovagonmash (previously MMZ and OKB-40):

 GM-5975 is used for 9K22 Tunguska
 GM-5965 is used for Ranzhir-M
 GM-5955 is used for Tor-M1 (SA-15). The export version Tor-M2E (9A331MK) was designed on a different MZKT-6922 wheeled chassis designed by MZKT.
 GM-579 is used for the SAM command post vehicle 9C470
 GM-577 is used for transporter erector launcher (TEL) with loading capability 9A39 (SA-11/17))
 GM-577 is also used for TELAR 9A310
 GM-578 was used for the TEL 2P25 of the 2K12 Kub Missile System
 GM-568 was used for Self-propelled Reconnaissance and Homing Vehicle (SURN) 1S91 of the 2K12 Kub Missile System (SA-6).
 GM-539 was used in SA-6B
 GM-575 chassis was used for ZSU-23-4 Shilka.

Also MMZ produced GM-569, GM-567A, GM-562, GM-5959, GM-5951, GM-5952.

Designed and developed at Minsk Tractor Works (MTZ):
 GM-369 tracked chassis
 GM-355 was used for BM (translit. Battle Machines) series 9A330, including Target Detection Station (SOTS), Homing Station (SN), and the TEL of 9K330 Tor Missile System
 GM-352 was used for the BM 2C6 (2K22 Tunguska)
 GM-352M chassis was used for 2T Stalker IFV.

By others:
 GM-123 and GM-124 were used for the 2S3 Akatsiya self-propelled gun based on 152mm D-20 gun as well as for 2K11 Krug SAM system, but also for 2S4 Tyulpan self-propelled mortar, 2S5 Giatsint-S self-propelled howitzer.
 GM-426 tracked chassis
 GM-830 and GM-835 were used for the S-300V SAM system, those chassis were developed by KB-3 of Leningrad Kirov Plant (currently, PO Spetsmash)

Notes

External links

Metrovagonmash official website 
 General description of GM-569, Specifications of GM-569 
 General description of GM-5955, Specifications of GM-5955 
 General description of GM-5975, Specifications of GM-5975

Vestnik PVO (pvo.guns.ru) 
 TELAR 9A38 
 Description of SAM command post vehicle 9C470 
 TEL with loading capability 9A39 
 TELAR 9A310 

Military vehicles of Russia
Tracked armoured fighting vehicles
Military vehicles of the Soviet Union
Mytishchi Machine-Building Plant products
Military vehicles introduced in the 1980s